The 2004–05 Superliga Espanola de Hockey Hielo season was the 31st season of the Superliga Espanola de Hockey Hielo, the top level of ice hockey in Spain. Seven teams participated in the league, and CH Jaca won the championship.

Standings

Playoffs

Semifinals
 CG Puigcerdà – CH Txuri Urdin 1:5
 FC Barcelona – CH Jaca 1:6, 0:3

Final 
 CH Jaca – CH Txuri Urdin 3:0 (4:0, 5:3, 3:2)

External links
Season on hockeyarchives.info

Liga Nacional de Hockey Hielo seasons
Spa
Liga